Jogwad (Jogvad, Jogwar )  is a village in the state of Gujarat in western India.

Population
The village population consists of Muslims and Hindus.  Unofficial records state the population of this village is approximately 6,700.  Many people from the village have emigrated and have now settled in Africa, Canada, the United States, Panama and United Kingdom.

Facilities
Some of the facilities that can be found in the village includes a private primary school (Aisha Siddiqa School), a nursery, Post Office, telephone calling points, a doctor's surgery and dispensary.  The village includes a Masjid, Madressa, Muslim Boys Scholars Seminary (Darul Uloom Zakariya), Muslim Girls Scholars Seminary (Darul Uloom Aisha Siddiqa) and a Boys Orphanage. There is a substantial Tuesday market which attracts shoppers from surrounding villages selling clothes, electronic products, meat and vegetables.

Occupation

Agriculture is the main form of occupation with  sugar-cane being the most popular cash crop. There are also a substantial number of Mango Groves. Bore wells, wells and the Ambika river are the main water sources used for drinking and irrigation.

Nearby and transport
Jogvad is 0.5 km from the Ambika River and about 1 km from the Ambika Aqueduct. Nearby villages like Kangvai and Bodvank are easy to get to via local transport infrastructure. The nearest small towns are Rankuwa and Chikhli, Gujarat and The nearest cities are Bilimora, Navsari, Surat and Valsad. There are infrequent direct buses to Navsari and Chikhli. The nearest main train station is in Navsari, Bilimora and Surat. The nearest airport is Surat International Airport, which is 69.7km north-west from the village. Another major international airport is Chhatrapati Shivaji International Airport, Mumbai, which is 234km south-west from Jogvad.

References

Villages in Navsari district